The 1971–72 season was Paris Saint-Germain's 2nd season in existence. PSG mainly played their home league games at the Stade Bauer in Saint-Ouen-sur-Seine, but occasionally at the Stade Yves-du-Manoir in Colombes as well, registering an average attendance of 10,030 spectators per match. Guy Crescent presided the club until December 1971, when Henri Patrelle replaced him. The team was coached by Pierre Phelipon, this time exclusively as manager. Jean Djorkaeff was the team captain.

Summary

PSG's first top-flight season ended with a safe 16th place, meaning they would stay in Division 1 next year, but behind the scenes the club was in a delicate financial situation. Back in September 1971, the Paris City Council offered 850k francs to pay the club's debt and save its place in the elite, demanding PSG in return to adopt the more Parisian name "Paris Football Club."  Coincidence or not, PSG suffered their biggest defeat ever in all competitions on that same month. It was a crushing 0–6 loss away to Nantes.

Guy Crescent, who had replaced Pierre-Étienne Guyot as club president before the start of the season, was in favor of the name change, but Henri Patrelle was against it. The disagreement led to Crescent's resignation in December 1971, handing the presidency to Patrelle. The latter tried to persuade the council to reconsider their position, but they remained inflexible and the club split on June 1, 1972, a few days after the last match of the campaign. Backed by the council, Crescent re-formed Paris FC and remained in Division 1, while the PSG of Patrelle were administratively relegated to Division 3, thus losing professional status.

Players

As of the 1971–72 season.

Squad

Transfers

As of the 1971–72 season.

Arrivals

Departures

Kits

The club didn't have a shirt sponsor. French sportswear brand Le Coq Sportif was the kit manufacturer.

Competitions

Overview

Division 1

League table

Results by round

Matches

Coupe de France

Round of 64

Statistics

As of the 1971–72 season.

Appearances and goals

|-
!colspan="16" style="background:#dcdcdc; text-align:center"|Goalkeepers

|-
!colspan="16" style="background:#dcdcdc; text-align:center"|Defenders

|-
!colspan="16" style="background:#dcdcdc; text-align:center"|Midfielders

|-
!colspan="16" style="background:#dcdcdc; text-align:center"|Forwards

|-
!colspan="16" style="background:#dcdcdc; text-align:center"|Players transferred / loaned out during the season

|-

References

External links

Official websites
PSG.FR - Site officiel du Paris Saint-Germain
Paris Saint-Germain - Ligue 1 
Paris Saint-Germain - UEFA.com

Paris Saint-Germain F.C. seasons
French football clubs 1971–72 season